Cheontaesan is a South Korean mountain in the counties of Geumsan, Chungcheongnam-do and Yeongdong, Chungcheongbuk-do in South Korea.

See also
List of mountains in Korea

Notes

References

Mountains of South Korea
Mountains of North Chungcheong Province
Mountains of South Chungcheong Province
Geumsan County
Yeongdong County

zh:天台山 (忠清道)